

Diary of the season
In the 2012–13 season of competitive football (soccer) in Cape Verde:
September 9 - Corinthians São Vicente celebrated its 25th anniversary of foundation
September 26 - Alexandre Alhinho becomes manager of Académica do Mindelo
November 18: Académica do Fogo celebrated their 50th anniversary
December 15: Académica da Praia celebrated their 50th anniversary
GD Palmeira won the Sal Super Cup
The 2013 Santo Antão North Zone Island League was the first season that the Second Division was added, Beira-Mar, Irmãos Unidos and Janela appeared in the lowest division
Paulense won the Santo Antão North Zone  Cup
Académica do Porto Novo won the Santo Antão South Zone Cup
Batuque won the São Vicente Cup
Sport Sal Rei Club won the Boa Vista (Bubista) Cup
Academico 83 won the Maio (Djarmai) Cup
GD Palmeira won the Sal Cup
CD Travadores won the Santiago South Zone Cup
Paulense won the Santo Antão North Zone Cup
Académica do Porto Novo won the Santo Antão South Zone Cup
FC Ultramarina won the São Nicolau Cup
CS Mindelense won the São Vicente Cup
May 5: all qualifiers listed into the Cape Verdean football championships.
May 11: Cape Verdean Football Championships begun
May 23: Juventude da Furna won the Brava Cup after beating Sporting Brava 3-0, as the Cape Verdean Cup was cancelled, it did not qualify 
May 26: Desportivo Praia defeated Ultramarina 1-4 and became the highest scoring match of the season and the largest goal difference for a week
June 1:
Mindelense defeated Ultramarina 4-0 and made it the largest goal difference of the season and became the second highest scoring match
Solpontense defeated Académico 83 with four goals and became the third and fourth highest scoring match for each clubs for the season
June 9:
Desportivo Praia defeatred Juventude Furna 1-4 and became the fourth highest scoring match of the season
Regular season ends, Sporting Praia, Mindelense, Acadèmicas from Fogo and Porto Novo and Desportivo advanced into the semis
June 22: the Semifinals started
June 29: Mindelense and Académica Porto Novo qualified into the finals
July 13: CS Mindelense claimed their ninth title
August 3: Académica do Sal celebrated its 50th anniversary

Final standings

Cape Verdean Football Championships

Desportivo da Praia had the most points numbered thirteen and scored twelve goals, Mindelense was second in Group A.  In Group B, Académicas Fogo and Porto Novo, the first had eleven points and the second had ten.  Mindelense advanced to the finals with two over Académica Fogo while Académica Porto Novo had two over Desportivo Praia.  With a total of five goals scored in the two matches, Mindelense won their ninth title

Group A

Group B

Final Stages

Leading goalscorer: Dukinha (CS Mindelense) - 6 goals

Cape Verdean Super Cup
The Cape Verdean Super Cup took place in late 2012 and featured the Onze Unidos and the champion Sporting Clube da Praia.  It was one of the recent to have its own super cup competitions added.

Island or regional competitions

Regional Championships

Regional Cups

Regional Super Cups
The 2012 champion winner played with a 2012 cup winner (when a club won both, a second place club competed).

Regional Opening Tournaments

Transfer deals

Summer-Fall transfer window
The September/October transfer window runs from the end of the previous season in September up to October.
 Ballack from Sporting Praia to  Oriental
 Calú from CS Mindelense to  Progresso Sambizanga
 Patrick Andrade (or Patrick) from Sporting Praia to Desportivo da Praia

In early and mid 2013
 Théo Mendy from Sporting Praia to  Boavista Lisbon
 Patrick from Desportivo da Praia to Benfica da Praia

See also
2012 in Cape Verde
2013 in Cape Verde
Timeline of Cape Verdean football

References

 
 
2012 in association football
2013 in association football